Barbarossa Hotel is the oldest hotel in Konstanz, Germany located on the historic Obermarkt square, where two old taverns, "Haus zum Egli" and "Haus zum Kemlin", were first documented in 1419. The later hotel name was after the Emperor Frederick Barbarossa who concluded the Peace of Constance.

In 19th century the hotel walls were decorated with paintings and today visitors can use the restaurant with seats also outside on the square.

See also 
List of oldest companies

References

External links 
Homepage

Hotels in Germany
Restaurants in Germany
Companies established in the 15th century
15th-century establishments in the Holy Roman Empire